A Plea for Sanity is an album by trumpeter Jack Walrath which was recorded in 1981 and released on the Stash label in 1982.

Reception

The AllMusic review by Scott Yanow stated "This is one of the best showcases for Jack Walrath's trumpet playing. ... The music falls into the wide area of post-bop, more advanced than hard bop but not as free as most avant-garde music. Walrath, who has always had a gift for coming up with memorable song titles (including on this LP "Li'l Stinker," "A Plea for Sanity," and "At Home in Rome"), gives each selection its own purpose and his solos are full of spirit and consistent invention. Recommended".

Track listing
All compositions by Jack Walrath except where noted
 "Hi Jinx" – 6:45
 "Ballad for Old Time's Sake"  (Michael Cochrane) – 5:15
 "Li'l Stinker" – 5:30
 "Free Fall" (Cochrane) – 3:35
 "Mucene the Genii" – 6:05
 "A Plea for Sanity" – 4:53
 "At Home in Rome" – 6:05

Personnel
Jack Walrath – trumpet 
Michael Cochrane – piano
Anthony Cox – bass

References

Stash Records albums
Jack Walrath albums
1982 albums